Black & White 050505 is the fourteenth studio album (of original material) by Scottish rock band Simple Minds, released in the UK in September 2005. The album was not officially released in the US.

Overview 
Work on this follow-up to Cry started in 2002 and was heavily influenced by the band's live work from that period. At the time of the album release, Jim Kerr stated about the new album: "Having delivered Black and White 050505, an album that we believe is classic Simple Minds, albeit with a whole new energy. We can honestly say that we are delighted with the results and look forward with a totally revitalised outlook to this next phase of our on going creativity."

Recording 
The sessions for Black And White 050505 yielded an album and a half of material. The tracks "Light Travels" and "Fortune Teller" were left off the album because Jim Kerr did not want to compromise the album's structure or overall feel.

Demoed for Black And White 050505, "Light Travels" was later rerecorded and released on Graffiti Soul (2009).

After initially appearing as an idea of a melody during the recording sessions for Good News from the Next World (1995) and recorded for Black And White 050505 (2005) as "Fortune Teller", the song was then considered for Graffiti Soul (2009) but, again, not released until it was finally rerecorded (and retitled) as "Magic" for Walk Between Worlds (2018).

The recording sessions for the album ended on 5 May 2005 (05/05/05), hence the number in the album's title.

Track listing

Standard edition

2019 Deluxe Edition and Rejuvenation 2001–2014 box set bonus tracks
Source:

Left-overs 
At least, another track was demoed for Black & White 050505: "Angel Under My Skin" written by Mark Kerr and Erikah Karst during the Cry period (2002). The song was later worked on for Graffiti Soul (2009) before it was finally recorded and released on Walk Between Worlds (2018).

Live performances 
All the songs have been played live:

 "Stay Visible" during the 2005 "Intimate", 2006 "Black And White", 2009 "30 Years Live European" & 2009 "Graffiti Soul" tours
 "Home" during the 2005 "Intimate", 2006 "Black And White", 2008 "Celebrate 30 Years Live", 2009 "30 Years Live European" & 2009 "Graffiti Soul", 2010 "Festival Show", 2010 "Final Shows" tours
 "Stranger" during the 2005 "Intimate" & 2006 "Black And White" tours 
 "Different World [taormina.me]" during the 2005 "Intimate", 2006 "Black And White" & 2009 "30 Years Live European" tours 
 "Underneath The Ice" only during the 2006 "Black And White" tour 
 "The Jeweller Part 2" during the 2005 "Intimate" & 2006 "Black And White" tours 
 "A Life Shot in Black & White" only during the 2006 "Black And White" tour 
 "Kiss The Ground" only one time (in Copenhagen, Denmark) during the 2006 "Black And White" tour 
 "Dolphins" during the 2006 "Black And White" & 2009 "30 Years Live European" tours

Personnel 
Adapted from the album's liner notes, except where noted.
Simple Minds
Jim Kerr — vocals
Charlie Burchill — guitars, keyboards, programming on "Bird on a Wire"
Mel Gaynor — drums, percussion
Eddie Duffy — bass guitar, percussion

Additional musicians
Andy Gillespie — keyboards
Jez Coad — additional guitars and keyboards
Daniele Tignino — backing vocals on "Stranger"
John Biancale — backing vocals on "Stranger"
Sean Kelly — guest vocals on "Too Much Television" 

Technical
Simple Minds — producer, arrangements
Jez Coad — producer, arrangements 
Kevin Hunter — producer on "Bird on a Wire"
Arjen Mensinga — engineer 
Michiel Hoogenboezem — engineer 
Chris Fuderich — engineer on "Bird on a Wire"
Bob Clearmountain — mixing
Brandon Duncan — mixing assistant
Kevin Harp — mixing on "Bird on a Wire"
Bob Ludwig — mastering
Daniele Tignino — pre-production in Taormina, Sicily 
Ottavio Leo — pre-production in Taormina, Sicily 
Gordy Goudie — pre-production in Glasgow, Scotland 
Kevin Burleigh — pre-production in Glasgow, Scotland 
Andy Gillespie — pre-production in Glasgow, Scotland 
Fabrique — design
Chris van Diemen — art direction, design, photography 
Jeroen van Erp — art direction, design
Arjan van den Berg — band photography 
Chantal Wouters — photography

Certifications

References

Sources 
 Official Simple Minds web site

2005 albums
Simple Minds albums
Sanctuary Records albums